Henne (English: Her) is a Norwegian women's magazine published in Oslo, Norway.

History and profile
Henne was founded by Aller Media in 1994. The first issue was released on 8 March 1994. The magazine is part of Aller media and published by Allers Familie-Journal on a monthly basis.

The headquarters of Henne is in Oslo. The magazine focuses on fashion and style and  contains articles on fashion, travel, interior decoration, food, trends, career, beauty and health. Its target group is active, urbane women aged 30–39.

Its editor was Ellen Arnstad from its inception in 1994 to 2011. She also contributed to the establishment of the magazine. Laila Madsö replaced Arnstad as editor of the magazine in 2011.

In 2003 Henne was the third best-selling women's magazine in Norway with a circulation of 52,000 copies. The magazine had a circulation of 52,636 copies in 2004. Its circulation was 36,401 copies in 2010.

References

External links
 Official website

1994 establishments in Norway
Magazines established in 1994
Magazines published in Oslo
Norwegian-language magazines
Monthly magazines published in Norway
Women's fashion magazines
Women's magazines published in Norway